The Argentina national baseball team (Spanish: Selección de béisbol de Argentina) is the national baseball team of Argentina. The team represents Argentina in international competitions. They are nicknamed "The Gauchos."

The national team has won the South American Baseball Championship on 7 different occasions, the last one of which was held in Buenos Aires, in April 2018, after defeating Brazil by a score of 7 to 1 (their previous victories were in 1959, 2004, 2011, 2012, 2013, 2016). Thanks to this victory, Argentina's baseball team qualified for the 2019 Pan American Games, the first time the team has ever qualified.

In 2022, Argentina participated for the first time in the 2023 World Baseball Classic qualification.

Results and fixtures
The following is a list of professional baseball match results currently active in the latest version of the WBSC World Rankings, as well as any future matches that have been scheduled.

Legend

2022

2019

2018

Tournament results

World Baseball Classic

Roster

References

External links
 

National baseball teams
Baseball
Baseball in Argentina